Bathyfautor caledonicus is a species of sea snail, a marine gastropod mollusk in the family Calliostomatidae.

Distribution
This marine species occurs off New Caledonia.

References

 Marshall, B. A. (1995). Calliostomatidae (Gastropoda: Trochoidea) from New Caledonia, the Loyalty Islands, and the northern Lord Howe Rise. in: Bouchet, P. (Ed.) Résultats des Campagnes MUSORSTOM 14. Mémoires du Muséum national d'Histoire naturelle. Série A, Zoologie. 167: 381-458

External links
 To World Register of Marine Species
  Australian Museum: Bathyfautor caledonicus

caledonicus
Gastropods described in 1995